Francis Rives Lassiter (February 18, 1866 – October 31, 1909) was a U.S. Representative from Virginia, great-nephew of Francis E. Rives.

Biography
Francie Rives Lassiter was born in Petersburg, Virginia on September 29, 1867, a son of Dr. Daniel W. Lassiter and Anna Rives (Heath) Lassiter. His siblings included William Lassiter, who was a career United States Army officer and attained the rank of major general.

Lassiter attended McCabe's University School at Petersburg and was graduated from the law department of the University of Virginia at Charlottesville in 1886. He was admitted to the bar in 1887 and commenced practice in Boston, Massachusetts. He returned to Petersburg, Virginia, in 1888 and continued the practice of law.  He became the City attorney of Petersburg from 1888 to 1893.  Lassiter was appointed by President Grover Cleveland to be United States attorney for the eastern district of Virginia in 1893 and served until 1896, when he resigned. He served as captain of Company G, Fourth Regiment, Virginia State Militia. He was appointed supervisor of the Twelfth Census for the Fourth Congressional District of Virginia in 1899.

Lassiter was elected as a Democrat to the Fifty-sixth Congress to fill the vacancy caused by the death of Sydney P. Epes. He was reelected to the Fifty-seventh Congress and served from April 19, 1900, to March 3, 1903.

Lassiter was elected to the Sixtieth and Sixty-first Congresses and served from March 4, 1907, until his death in Petersburg, Virginia, October 31, 1909. He is interred in Blandford Cemetery. His family papers are held by the Special Collections Research Center at the College of William & Mary.

Electoral history

1900; Lassiter was elected to the U.S. House of Representatives with 98.65% of the vote in a special election, defeating Independent James Seldon Cowdon; he was re-elected with 60.06% of the vote in the general election, defeating Republican C.E. Wilson.
1906; Lassiter was re-elected unopposed.
1908; Lassiter was re-elected unopposed.

See also
List of United States Congress members who died in office (1900–49)

References

External links
Finding aid for the Lassiter Papers
Francis Rives Lassiter, late a representative from Virginia, Memorial addresses delivered in the House of Representatives and Senate frontispiece 1910

1866 births
1909 deaths
Military personnel from Virginia
American militia officers
Democratic Party members of the United States House of Representatives from Virginia
Politicians from Petersburg, Virginia
United States Attorneys for the Eastern District of Virginia
19th-century American politicians
Burials at Blandford Cemetery